Andrate (Piedmontese: Andrà) is a comune (municipality) in the Metropolitan City of Turin in the Italian region Piedmont, located about  north of Turin.

Andrate borders the following municipalities: Settimo Vittone, Donato, Nomaglio, Borgofranco d'Ivrea, and Chiaverano. It is located at the top of the Moraine of Ivrea, with elevations ranging from 550 to 2,227 meters above the sea level.
 
The name of this town may have Celtic origins. It may come from the words and (end) and art (land).

References

Cities and towns in Piedmont
Articles which contain graphical timelines